Headquarters North West is a regional command based in North West England. The command administers the reserve units based in its area and also provides the military support HQ for the police and civilian population in the area. The units under its control are The Duke of Lancaster's Regiment, The Mercian Regiment, and the Royal Army Medical Corps and 2,600 Army Reserves from almost all services. The command also controls over 7,500 army cadets.

History
Under the Army 2020 Refine reorganisation, 42nd Infantry Brigade & Headquarters North West dropped its operational commitments and was reduced to a Colonel's command, becoming Headquarters North West.

Unit list 

 Headquarters North West, at Fulwood Barracks, Preston
 North West Officer Training Regiment (Army Reserve), at Fulwood Barracks, Preston
 Liverpool University Officer' Training Corps (Army Reserve), in Liverpool
 Manchester and Salford University Officers' Training Corps (Army Reserve), at University Barracks, Manchester
 Headquarters North West Cadet Training Team, at Fulwood Barracks, Preston
 Cheshire Army Cadet Force, at Fox Barracks, Chester
 Cumbria Army Cadet Force, at Carlisle Castle
 Greater Manchester Army Cadet Force, in Bury
 Isle of Man Army Cadet Force, in Douglas
 Lancashire Army Cadet Force, at Fulwood Barracks, Preston
 Merseyside Army Cadet Force, at Altcar Training Camp, Hightown

References

External links 
 Army 2020 Refine Order of Battle

British Army Regional Points of Command
Military units and formations established in 2017